Sobolewo may refer to the following places:
Sobolewo, Białystok County in Podlaskie Voivodeship (north-east Poland)
Sobolewo, Suwałki County in Podlaskie Voivodeship (north-east Poland)
Sobolewo, Wysokie Mazowieckie County in Podlaskie Voivodeship (north-east Poland)
Sobolewo, Greater Poland Voivodeship (west-central Poland)
Sobolewo, West Pomeranian Voivodeship (north-west Poland)

See also
Sobolevo, list of places in Russia